Stockland is an unincorporated community in Stockland Township, Iroquois County, Illinois.

Geography

References

Unincorporated communities in Iroquois County, Illinois
Unincorporated communities in Illinois